Vladimir G. Kanovei (born 1951) is a Russian mathematician working at the Institute for Information Transmission Problems in Moscow, Russia.  His interests include mathematical logic and foundations, as well as mathematical history.

Selected publications

.
Kanovei, Vladimir; Reeken, Michael; Nonstandard analysis, axiomatically. Springer Monographs in Mathematics. Springer-Verlag, Berlin, 2004. xvi+408 pp. 
Kanovei, Vladimir; Borel equivalence relations. Structure and classification. University Lecture Series, 44. American Mathematical Society, Providence, RI, 2008. x+240 pp. 
Kanoveĭ, V.; Reeken, M.; On Ulam's problem concerning the stability of approximate homomorphisms. (Russian) Tr. Mat. Inst. Steklova 231 (2000), Din. Sist., Avtom. i Beskon. Gruppy, 249–283; translation in Proc. Steklov Inst. Math. 2000, no. 4 (231), 238–270
Kanoveĭ, V. G.; Lyubetskiĭ, V. A.; On some classical problems in descriptive set theory. (Russian) Uspekhi Mat. Nauk 58 (2003), no. 5(353), 3--88; translation in Russian Math. Surveys 58 (2003), no. 5, 839–927
Kanoveĭ, V. G.; Reeken, M.; Some new results on the Borel irreducibility of equivalence relations. (Russian) Izv. Ross. Akad. Nauk Ser. Mat. 67 (2003), no. 1, 59–82; translation in Izv. Math. 67 (2003), no. 1, 55–76 03E15 (54H05)
Kanovei, Vladimir; Reeken, Michael; Mathematics in a nonstandard world. II. Math. Japon. 45 (1997), no. 3, 555–571.
Kanovei, Vladimir; On non-wellfounded iterations of the perfect set forcing. Journal of Symbolic Logic 64 (1999), no. 2, 551–574.
Kanovei, Vladimir; Shelah, Saharon; A definable nonstandard model of the reals. Journal of Symbolic Logic 69 (2004), no. 1, 159–164.
Kanovei, Vladimir; Reeken, Michael. Internal approach to external sets and universes. I. Bounded set theory. Studia Logica  55  (1995),  no. 2, 229–257.
Kanovei, Vladimir; Reeken, Michael. Internal approach to external sets and universes. II. External universes over the universe of bounded set theory. Studia Logica  55  (1995),  no. 3, 347–376.
Kanovei, Vladimir; Reeken, Michael. Internal approach to external sets and universes. III. Partially saturated universes. Studia Logica  56  (1996),  no. 3, 293–322.

This series of three papers was reviewed by Karel Hrbacek here.

External links
Home page

People from Odesa Oblast
Model theorists
1951 births
Living people